This is a list of electoral results for the electoral district of Townsville in Queensland state elections.

Members for Townsville

Election results

Elections in the 2020s

Elections in the 2010s

Elections in the 2000s

Elections in the 1990s

Elections in the 1980s

Elections in the 1970s

Elections in the 1960s 

See Electoral district of Townsville South 1960-1986 and Electoral district of Townsville North 1960-1972 created through redistribution.

Also see Electoral district of Townsville East 1986-1992, Electoral district of Townsville West 1972-1986, Electoral district of Mundingburra 1912-1960, 1992- and Electoral district of Burdekin 1949- created through redistributions.

Elections in the 1950s

Elections in the 1940s

Elections in the 1930s 

 Preferences were not distributed.

 Preferences were not distributed.

Elections in the 1920s

Elections in the 1910s

References

Queensland state electoral results by district